Kilchrenan is a small village in the Argyll and Bute area of Scotland.
It forms part of the area of Avich and Kilchrenan Community Council.

The tomb of Colin More Campbell of Lochawe, who was killed at the Battle of Red Ford in 1294, can be seen in the churchyard of Kilchrenan. It is described as “a narrow old tomb with sculpture much defaced.”

See also 
 Annat

References

External links 

Villages in Argyll and Bute